The equivalent rectangular bandwidth or ERB is a measure used in psychoacoustics, which gives an approximation to the bandwidths of the filters in human hearing, using the unrealistic but convenient simplification of modeling the filters as rectangular band-pass filters, or band-stop filters, like in tailor-made notched music training (TMNMT).

Approximations 

For moderate sound levels and young listeners, the bandwidth of human auditory filters can be approximated by the polynomial equation:

where f is the center frequency of the filter in kHz and ERB(f) is the bandwidth of the filter in Hz. The approximation is based on the results of a number of published simultaneous masking experiments and is valid from 0.1 to 6.5 kHz.

The above approximation was given in 1983 by Moore and Glasberg, who in 1990 published another (linear) approximation:

where f is in kHz and ERB(f) is in Hz. The approximation is applicable at moderate sound levels and for values of f between 0.1 and 10 kHz.

ERB-rate scale
The ERB-rate scale, or  ERB-number scale, can be defined as a function ERBS(f) which returns the number of equivalent rectangular bandwidths below the given frequency f. The units of the ERB-number scale are known ERBs, or as Cams, following a suggestion by Hartmann. The scale can be constructed by solving the following differential system of equations:

The solution for ERBS(f) is the integral of the reciprocal of ERB(f) with the constant of integration set in such a way that ERBS(0) = 0.

Using the second order polynomial approximation for ERB(f) yields:

 

where f is in kHz. The VOICEBOX speech processing toolbox for MATLAB implements the conversion and its inverse as:

 
 

where f is in Hz.

Using the linear approximation for ERB(f) yields:

 

where f is in Hz.

See also

 Critical bands
 Bark scale

References

External links 
 https://web.archive.org/web/20110427105916/http://www.ling.su.se/staff/hartmut/bark.htm

Acoustics
Hearing
Signal processing